Iquiara tuiuca is a species of beetle in the family Cerambycidae, and the only species in the genus Iquiara. It was described by Martins and Galileo in 1998.

References

Hemilophini
Beetles described in 1998